Communion is an album by jazz bassist John Patitucci, released in 2001.

Background
Patitucci had released three albums for Concord Records before this one.

Music and recording
The album's 10 tracks featured a total of 18 musicians. A variety of material is covered, including "On the balladic title track, he writes a supple arrangement for string quartet, and elsewhere leans toward Brazil (as on the engaging, rapid-fire "Choro Luoco", dedicated to Hermeto Pascoal) and other Latin elements (i.e., the catchy, sambaesque "Bariloche")." Mal Waldron's "Soul Eyes" is played as a duet with pianist Brad Mehldau.

Reception

The AllMusic reviewer commented that "Some of the cuts are less than memorable ("Isabella", "Misterioso"), and the stronger ones succeed more in terms of orchestration than melody."

Track listing

Personnel 

 John Patitucci – bass guitar, double bass
 Branford Marsalis – soprano sax
 Joe Lovano – tenor sax
 Chris Potter – tenor sax, soprano sax
 Tim Ries – clarinet, flute
 Brad Mehldau – piano
 Bruce Barth – piano
 Edward Simon – piano
 Brian Blade – drums
 Horacio Hernández – drums
 Valtinho Anastacio – percussion
 Duduka da Fonseca – percussion
 Marc Quiñones – percussion, conga
 Luciana Souza – vocals
 Elizabeth Lim-Dutton – violin
 Richard Rood – violin
 Lawrence Dutton – viola
 Sachi Patitucci – cello

Production
 John Patitucci – producer
 Joe Barbaria – engineer, mixing
 Allan Tucker – mastering

References

John Patitucci albums
2001 albums